The Archangel Raphael Leaving Tobias' Family is a 1637 oil-on-panel painting by Rembrandt, now in the Louvre, in Paris, France.

1637 paintings
Paintings by Rembrandt
Paintings in the Louvre by Dutch, Flemish and German artists
Paintings of Raphael (archangel)
Paintings depicting Tobias